Geo Super is the first 24-hour Karachi-based Pakistani Television channel dedicated to the world of Sports. It is owned by the Jang Group of Newspapers. Geo Super was launched in September 2006. It has broadcasting rights for many sporting events such as Badminton, Cricket, Football, Hockey, and others.

Launch
In late September 2006, Geo Television Network launched Geo Super. Geo Super broadcasts sports events, focusing mainly on cricket, with secondary focuses on football and field hockey. Shortly after its launch, Geo Super managed to secure the television rights of the ICC tournaments for the next five years covering all major cricketing events like ICC Cricket World Cup, ICC Champions Trophy, Twenty20 World Cup, Faysal Bank T20 Cup and ICC Under-19 Cricket World Cup.

Subscription
Geo Super is an encrypted channel and is only available in Pakistan (legally) free for cable operators. The whole Geo Network uses Conax encryption with KAON set-top boxes.

Coverage
Currently, Geo Super has broadcasting rights for Cricket, Football, And Tennis. In Cricket Geo Super has rights for Afghanistan Cricket till 2023. It also has cricket leagues rights including Emirates D10 until 2021. Kashmir Premier League, Legends League Cricket until 2022 Mzansi Super League and Oman D10 until 2022. In Football Geo Super Has Rights For La Liga Until 2022. In Tennis Geo Super Has Rights For World TeamTennis Until 2021.

Country Cricket

Country Professional Cricket Leagues

Country Professional Football Leagues

Hockey

Kabaddi

Country Professional Tennis Leagues

Wrestling

Featured programmes

Score
Score is the most popular show of Geo Super which is hosted by Yahya Hussaini. Sometimes, Sikandar Bakht and Shoaib Akhtar accompany him in the show. The show also got famous become the Yahya Hussaini curse. The curse was that which ever cricketer Yahya Hussaini took a photo with, he or his team played really bad in the upcoming matches. The show mainly covers cricket news but sometimes also covers other sports.

Sports Lounge
Sports Lounge is the second most popular show of Geo Super. It is hosted by Haider Azhar.

See also 

 Geo Television Network
 Jang Group of Newspapers

References

External links
 
 
 
 Geo Super Frequency
  

Geo TV
Television stations in Pakistan
Sports television in Pakistan
Television stations in Lahore
Television channels and stations established in 2006